Princess Kannikakaew, the Princess Khattiyakanlaya (10 December 1855 – 13 May 1882) was the Princess of Siam (later Thailand. She was a member of Siamese royal family and is a daughter of King Mongkut and Princess Phannarai. She is a half-sister (different mother) of King Chulalongkorn and had one younger brother, Prince Narisara Nuvadtivongs.

References 

1855 births
1882 deaths
Thai female Chao Fa
19th-century Thai women
19th-century Chakri dynasty
People from Bangkok
Thai female Phra Ong Chao
Children of Mongkut
Daughters of kings